Deh Kohneh-ye Moozarm (also Romanized as Deh Kohneh-ye Moozarm; also known as Moozarm, Moozarm, Moozarn, Moozarm, and Moozarm) is a village in Dehdez Rural District, Dehdez District, Izeh County, Khuzestan Province, Iran. At the 2006 census, its population was 2500, in 500 families.

References

Populated places in Izeh County